Jeong Gu (1543–1620), also spelled as Jung Goo, was a Korean historian, philosopher, poet, and politician of the Joseon period. He learned from the Korean scholars Yi Hwang and Cho Shik. A key figure of the Neo-Confucian literati, he established the Yeongnam School and set up the Baikmaewon(백매원, 百梅園), a private Confucian academy. His pen name was Hangang(한강, 寒岡)·Hoiyunyain(회연야인, 檜淵野人), and courtesy name was Doga(도가, 道可) and Gabo(가보, 可父).

He was the ideological successor of Yi Hwang and Cho Shik, moral support of South Man Party(남인, 南人) and North Man Party(북인, 北人)s. his master of Heo Mok and Yun Hyu, Yun Seondo, there's Yesong ontroversy(예송논쟁) then polemic of South Man Party's.

Works 
 HangangMunjip(한강문집 寒岡文集)
 Taegeukmunbyun(태극문변 太極問辨)
 GAryejipramboju(가례집람보주 家禮輯覽補註)
 Ohseonsaengyeseolbunryu(오선생예설분류 五先生禮說分類)
 Gangjangrok(갱장록 羹墻錄)
 Shimgyungbalhwe(심경발휘 心經發揮)
 Shimuijejobup(심의제조법 深衣製造法)
 Yefisangryubunryu(예기상례분류 禮記喪禮分類)
 Ohbokyunhyukdo(오복연혁도 五福沿革圖)
 Toegyesanjeryemundab(퇴계상제례문답 退溪喪祭禮問答)
 Gaejeongjujaseojeolyochongmok(개정주자서절요총목 改定朱子書節要總目)
 SEonghyunpung(성현풍 聖賢風)
 SEonghyunpungBeom(성현풍범 聖賢風範)
 Susaeuninrock(수사언인록 洙泗言仁錄)
 Yumjangarngjangrock(염락갱장록 濂洛羹墻錄)
 Gwanui(관의 冠儀)
 Honui(혼의 婚儀)
 Jangui(장의 葬儀)
 Gyeui(계의 稧儀)
 Yukdaeginyon(역대기년 歷代紀年)
 Gogeumchungmo(고금충모 古今忠謨)
 Chiranjeyo(치란제요 治亂提要)
 wharyongji(와룡지 臥龍誌)
 Uianjipbang(의안집방 醫眼集方)
 Gwangsasoljip(광사속집 廣嗣續集)
 Changshanji(창산지 昌山誌)
 Dongbokji(동복지 同福志)
 Kwandongji(관동지 關東志)
 Younggaji(영가지 永嘉志)
 Pyungyangji(평양지 平壤志)
 Hamjuji(함주지 咸州志)
 Jujashibunryu(주자시분류 朱子詩分類)
 Ghogeumhoisu(고금회수 古今會粹)

See also 
 Yi Hwang
 Cho sik
 Heo Mok
 Yun Seondo
 Yun Hyu
 Yi Seo-woo
 Yu Hyung-won

References

External links 

Jeong gu:Naver 
Hangang Jeong Gu 
Cyber Dosan Seowon, general information on Yi Hwang and his teachings
The T'oegye Studies Institute, Busan
Jeong gu
Jeong gu 

1543 births
1620 deaths
16th-century Korean philosophers
16th-century Korean poets
17th-century Korean philosophers
17th-century Korean poets
Cheongju Jeong clan
Joseon scholar-officials
Korean Confucianists
Korean historians